Mexichromis albofimbria is a species of sea slug or dorid nudibranch, a marine gastropod mollusk in the family Chromodorididae.

Distribution
This nudibranch is known from New Caledonia.

Description
Mexichromis albofimbria has a pale-pink body, a thin white-lined mantle and pale orange gills and rhinophores. It is almost identical to Thorunna punicea and very similar to members of the Hypselodoris bullocki group.

This species can reach a total length of at least 11 mm, and like all  Chromodorids, feeds on sponges.

References

Chromodorididae
Gastropods described in 1995